The 1989 Sovran Bank Classic was a men's tennis tournament played on outdoor hard courts at the William H.G. FitzGerald Tennis Center in Washington, D.C. in the United States that was part of the 1989 Nabisco Grand Prix. It was the 21st edition of the tournament was held from July 24 through July 30, 1989. First-seeded Tim Mayotte won the singles title.

Finals

Singles

 Tim Mayotte defeated  Brad Gilbert 3–6, 6–4, 7–5
 It was Mayotte's only singles title of the year and the 12th and final of his career.

Doubles

 Neil Broad /  Gary Muller defeated  Jim Grabb /  Patrick McEnroe 6–7, 7–6, 6–4
 It was Broad's 2nd title of the year and the 2nd of his career. It was Muller's only title of the year and the 2nd of his career.

References

External links
 ATP tournament profile
 ITF tournament edition details

Sovran Bank Classic
Washington Open (tennis)
1989 in sports in Washington, D.C.
1989 in American tennis